South Tongu District is one of the eighteen districts in Volta Region, Ghana. Originally created as an ordinary district assembly on 10 March 1989, which was created from the former Tongu District Council, which was established by Legislative Instrument (L.I.) 1466. The district assembly is located in the southwest part of Volta Region and has Sogakope as its capital town.

Geography
There are many streams in South Tongu District. The prominent ones are the Chinni and the Todzi. The Volta River runs to the west of this district.

Boundaries
South Tongu District is bounded by:

 the Lake Volta to the west and south west,
 North Tongu District to the north-west,
 Akatsi South District to the north-east, and
 Keta District to the south.

External links
 
 GhanaDistricts.com
 South Tongu District Official Website

References

Districts of Volta Region